Club Independiente Santa Fe Femenino, commonly known as Independiente Santa Fe or simply Santa Fe, is a professional women's football club based in Bogotá, Colombia. They are the women's football section of Independiente Santa Fe and they currently play in the Colombian Women's Football League, the top level women's football league in Colombia. To date, the club has won two league titles.

Like the institution's male counterpart, who were the first Colombian professional football champion in the 1948 season, the women's team obtained the honor of being the first team to win the Colombian Women's Football League, with their title in the first edition of the competition in 2017. 

In 2016, for the foundation of the women's team, Independiente Santa Fe formed an alliance with the amateur team Future Soccer, thus establishing the team.

History
In 2000, a football school named Club Los Amigos was established in the south of Bogotá, which also attracts women. In 2005, the club was renamed Club Future Soccer. In 2006, the club took part in its first women's tournament and made a name for itself in the country with its young teams. In 2013, players from Future Soccer were called up to the national under-17 team.

In 2016, the creation of a Colombian Women's Football Championship was announced. Future Soccer had sought an alliance with a big club from Bogotá to register in this new championship. The collaboration started with Independiente Santa Fe, which entered the team in the amateur championship where the team was unbeaten all the first phase and lost in the final on penalties against Club Molino Viejo.

In 2017, the first women's championship was launched, Santa Fe strengthened its team with international players and won its first match on February 19 three to zero against La Equidad at home. The Lionesses won all their matches of the first phase, they went into the final where they defeated Atlético Huila (2–1 and 1–0), in the return match at Estadio El Campín where the club set an attendance record for a women's football match with 33,327 spectators. Like the men's section in 1948, Santa Fe Femenino won the first national women's football championship. 

In 2018, Santa Fe were first in its group but were eliminated in the semi-finals. The following season, they were eliminated in the quarter-finals. In 2020, Santa Fe won their second title by defeating América de Cali in the final, while in 2021 they also made it to the final, in which they lost to Deportivo Cali.

Honours

Domestic
Liga Femenina Profesional:
Winners (2): 2017, 2020
Runners-up (1): 2021

International
Copa Libertadores Femenina:
Runners-up (1): 2021

References

 
Women's football clubs in Colombia
Association football clubs established in 2016
2016 establishments in Colombia